Acharya Dharasena was a Digambara monk of first century CE.

Biography
Āchārya Dharasena, in first century CE, guided two Āchāryas, Āchārya Pushpadant and Āchārya Bhutabali, to put the teachings of Mahavira in the written form. The two Āchāryas wrote, on palm leaves, Ṣaṭkhaṅḍāgama- among the oldest known Digambara Jain texts. Digambara tradition consider him to be the 33rd teacher in succession of Gautama, 683 years after the nirvana of Mahavira.

Notes

References
 

Indian Jain monks 
1st-century Indian Jains 
1st-century Jain monks 
1st-century Indian monks